A rookery is a colony of breeding animals, generally gregarious birds.

Coming from the nesting habits of rooks, the term is used for corvids and the breeding grounds of colony-forming seabirds, marine mammals (true seals and sea lions), and even some turtles. Rooks (northern-European and central-Asian members of the crow family) have multiple nests in prominent colonies at the tops of trees. Paleontological evidence points to the existence of rookery-like colonies in the pterosaur Pterodaustro.

The term rookery was also borrowed as a name for dense slum housing in nineteenth-century cities, especially in London.

See also
Auca Mahuevo, for a titanosaurid sauropod dinosaur rookery
Bird colony
Heronry
Rook shooting

References

Birds
Reproductive ecology